Astoria is the fourth studio album recorded by Canadian rock band Marianas Trench. It was released on October 23, 2015, through 604 Records (in Canada) and Cherrytree Records and Interscope Records (internationally). The album represents the band's official return to the music scene after promotion of their previous album, Ever After (2011), ended in 2013, and was preceded by the retrospective EP, Something Old / Something New earlier in 2015.

Background
In 2011, Marianas Trench released their third studio album, Ever After, which produced five top-50 singles, including lead single "Haven't Had Enough", which became the group's highest charting single to date (since the creation of the Billboard Canadian Hot 100 in 2007) at number 9. After releasing the last single from that era, "By Now", in 2013, the group returned to the studio to record their next album. During the promotion for Ever After, lead singer and songwriter, Josh Ramsay, also achieved mainstream success as a songwriter and producer on fellow Canadian Carly Rae Jepsen's No. 1 hit "Call Me Maybe" (2012). This helped pave the way for the band signing an American record deal with Cherrytree Records and promoting to a broader audience.

The group released "Pop 101" featuring hip hop artist Anami Vice on July 29, 2014 as the intended lead single for the then-unnamed fourth album. A second single, "Here's to the Zeros", was released in December 2014, with the full album expected the following spring (2015). The album's release was later pushed back to the fall. When the band officially announced Astoria, they ultimately decided not to include either of these tracks, as they no longer fit the tone of the record. Both of these buzz singles, along with two previously-unreleased songs recorded before their debut album, Fix Me (2006), were instead released as a four-track extended play fittingly titled Something Old / Something New that was released on May 26, 2015.

Concept
Similar to their previous two albums (2009's Masterpiece Theatre and 2011's Ever After), Astoria is conceived as a loose concept album, with a cohesive theme and transition tracks bridging the individual songs composing the album. According to Ramsay, this album is inspired by 1980s fantasy and adventure films, and The Goonies (1985) in particular. That film inspired the title (as it was set in Astoria, Oregon), the album's artwork, as well as the title of their accompanying US tour (Hey You Guys!!).

Promotion
Marianas Trench participated the US on the Hey You Guys!! Tour in the fall of 2015 in support of the album. The tour began in Portland, OR on November 3, 2015 and ended in Grand Rapids, MI on February 14, 2016. The band also released a video to their official Vevo channel regarding the making of the album. The group has also announced a Canadian tour called the "Never Say Die Tour", and will be accompanied by Walk Off The Earth .  The tour is set to start on March 9, 2016. On May 20, the group released a music video for "This Means War". In July and August, the group went on the SPF 80s tour in the US.

Singles
"One Love" was released on September 14, 2015 as the official lead single for the album. It entered the Billboard Canadian Hot 100 at number 60 on the chart dated October 3, 2015. The song has been described by critics as more pop than the group's earlier music and has also been favorably compared to previous ballad singles "Good to You" and "Fallout". "One Love" was serviced to American hot adult contemporary radio through 604 Records on November 9, 2015.

A second official single, "This Means War", was serviced to Canadian radio on February 16, 2016. It was the group's first single to not enter the Canadian Hot 100.

"Who Do You Love" was released as the third official single on September 8, 2016.

Promotional singles
The thirteenth track, "Wildfire", was released to iTunes on October 2, 2015 as a promotional single supporting pre-orders of the album.

Track listing
All music and lyrics by Josh Ramsay.

Personnel
Personnel per booklet.

Marianas Trench
 Josh Ramsay – vocals, guitar, piano, drums, bass, programming, string arrangement
 Matt Webb – guitar, piano, vocals
 Mike Ayley – bass, vocals
 Ian Casselman – drums, percussion, vocals

Additional musicians
 Dave Genn – guitar and Hammond organ on "Astoria"
 Morgan Hempstead – vocals on "Astoria" and "End of an Era"
 Roger Joseph Manning Jr. – vocals on "Astoria"
 Steve Marshall – vocals on "Astoria"
 Craig Northey – vocals on "Astoria" and "End of an Era"
 Sara Ramsay – vocals on "Astoria"
 Royce Whittaker – guitar on "Astoria"
 Bennie Ramsay – aux percussion and foot steps on "Astoria"
 "Yesterday" horn players:
 Mike Allen
 Kristy-Lee Audette
 Dominic Conway
 Jocelyn Waugh
 Ian Weiss
 "Shut Up and Kiss Me" The Marian-ettes:
 Rachel Ashmore
 Aiden Farrell
 Jessica Lee
 Natasha Pheko
 Cat Thomson
 "Who Do You Love" drummers:
 Peter Barone
 Flavio Cirillo
 Pedro Dzelme
 Alex Glassford
 Christopher Hockey
 Nik Pesut
 Paul Townsend
 Shane Wilson
 Brett Jamieson – guitar on "End of an Era"
 Dave "Rave" Ogilvie – additional synthesizers
 Colin Janz – additional synthesizers
 The Vancouver Film Orchestra – strings
 Hal Beckett – conductor

Production
 Josh Ramsay – producer, engineer, mixing
 Bennie and the Jets Ramsay - executive producer
 Kyle – assistant to executive producer
 Zach Blackstone – engineer, mixing assistant
 Kurtis S. Maas – engineer assistant
 Nik Pesut – drum tech, additional editing
 Shane Wilson – drum tech
 Roger Monk – engineer on strings
 Dave Ogilvie – mixing
 Satoshi Mark Noguchi – orchestra mixing
 Ted Jensen – mastering
 Garnet Armstrong – art direction, design
 Ivan Otis – photography, base photography
 Naeim Khavari – illustration, paint overs

Chart performance

Album

Singles

Certifications and sales

References

2015 albums
604 Records albums
Cherrytree Records albums
Interscope Records albums
Marianas Trench (band) albums
Concept albums